Jason King is a fictional character played by actor Peter Wyngarde in the TV series Department S and Jason King.  He is a successful adventure author turned sleuth. He is a member of the Department S team but is not under the command of Sullivan so carries out a more consultative role.  In several episodes at the beginning other characters ask "Is Jason King available?" He is not averse to using details from their cases to enhance the plots of his novels. His popular success as a writer affords him a playboy/hedonistic lifestyle and he is often seen with beautiful women, though he has no permanent love interest.

Jason King travels internationally but drives a car with a Swiss licence plate.  There is mention in the Department S series that he is a Swiss resident for tax purposes.

Original concept of Jason King
Monty Berman and Dennis Spooner created the TV adventure series Department S the character that became Jason King was to be one of the three main characters. When first conceived he was imagined to be a traditional stereotype of middle-aged gentleman novelist, an academic dressed in tweed and smoking a pipe. At that stage the character had no name. When the actor Peter Wyngarde was cast in the role he added his creative input to the character and persuaded Berman and Spooner to do something much more contemporary. It was Wyngarde who came up with the name Jason King and applied much of his own personality, style and wit to the role. He also came up with the name Mark Caine for his novel's hero which was also imbued with Jason King's personality. The ITC publicity material for the Department S series says;
Jason King is a novelist – a successful writer of crime thrillers, with a vivid imagination and flamboyant personality. He uses his imagination and know-how in theorising what has happened in each case, looking at it as if it were a situation devised for one of his books.

Peter Wyngarde reprised his character Jason King in the spin off action espionage series entitled Jason King (1971), which ran for one season of 26 episodes.

Looks
The most obvious aspect of Jason King was his striking appearance. Wyngarde created a completely new (for 1969) style of look and dress for King that was adopted and copied worldwide. He became a syle icon of the early 1970s. King was able to 'steal the scene' on screen whenever he walked on.

Tastes and style
Jason King was very particular about his appearance. He always sported a signature 'Jason King' droopy moustache, hair that looked like a bearskin hat and a wardrobe mostly of wide-lapelled, three-piece suits, cravats, kipper ties and open-necked shirts in colours from infra red to ultra violet.

King is an expert in haute cuisine. In an interview Peter Wyngarde claimed Jason King had champagne and strawberries for breakfast, just like he did. Jason King is a drinker of spirits and is particularly fond of whiskey. King is a heavy smoker, he is regularly seen carrying a box of Sobranie Cocktail cigarettes. A luxury European brand.

Jason King drives a Bentley S2 Continental Sports Saloon with Swiss number plates BE20838. It is claimed that this was Peter Wyngarde's own car.

Personal life
There is little back story to the character of Jason King.  He has no family to speak of but in the Department S episode "A Fish Out of Water" it is revealed that he is a widower whose wife, Marion King (a film actress), was killed in a plane crash. In the episode, Jason meets a character named Michelle Duplay who reminds him of his late wife.

Abilities
Jason is not averse to getting into hand-to-hand combat but is as likely to be defeated as often as he is victorious.  In one episode, he reveals he detests guns and never uses one.  This trait he passes on to his novels' hero Mark Caine. King also serves as comic relief in the Department S series

References

External links

Male characters in television
Fictional private investigators
Fictional writers
Fictional secret agents and spies
Television characters introduced in 1969
Fictional gamblers